Sehma may refer to:

Sehma (river), a river of Saxony, Germany
Sehma, Sehmatal, a district of the municipality Sehmatal in Saxony, Germany